Natsionalna Elektricheska Kompania EAD (NEK) is a single-owned joint-stock electric company headquartered in Sofia, Bulgaria. Bulgarian Energy Holding is the holder of the capital of NEK.

The main company's activities are the generation of electrical energy, purchase and sale of electrical energy, import and export of electrical energy. NEK is the owner of 30 hydro and pumped storage power plants with a total installed capacity of 2713 MW. Most of the hydropower is generated within four hydropower cascades: Belmeken-Sestrimo-Chaira; Batak, Vacha, and Dolna Arda. All are used to cover peak loads, and to regulate the grid system.

NEK is a holder of hydro (HPP&PS) generation license, electricity trading license and public power supply license, all issued by SEWRC.

NEK, through its branch Dams and Cascades, manages 40 dams and the total capacity of the storage reservoirs operated by NEK represents 50.1% of the total controlled water resources of the country.

References

External links

 

Electric power companies of Bulgaria
Government-owned companies of Bulgaria